Dibrachichthys melanurus is a species of four-armed frogfish found in the eastern Indian Ocean and western Pacific Ocean near to Indonesia and Australia where they are found over soft bottoms at depths of .  The males of this species grow to a length of  SL while the females grow to a length of  SL.  This species is the only known member of its genus.

References
 

Lophiiformes
Taxa named by Theodore Wells Pietsch III
Fish described in 2009